Chitra Dhanawalavithana (23 December 1936 – 31 May 2019 as චිත්‍රා වාකිෂ්ඨ) [Sinhala]), popularly as Chitra Wakishta, was an actress in Sri Lankan cinema, stage drama and television. Wakishta is best known for her role Somi Nona in Kopi Kade teledrama and she had a career that spanned more than six decades.

Personal life
She was born on 23 December 1936 in Punchi Borella. She completed her education from Buddhist Girls' School, Maradana, which is later known as Sri Sangamiththa Balika Vidyalaya, Colombo 10. She was married to Lloyd Wakisha. Lloyd was also a popular actor in his generation, who acted in stage drama Wes Muhunu and then in films such as Sihina Hathak, Kinkini Paada, Rena Giraw, Baduth Ekka Horu, Mee Masso, Gehenu Lamai, Adhishtana, Thani Tharuwa and Wadula. Lloyd was born in 1930 and died in 1981 at the age of 51. The couple has three sons - Ranjan, Shammi, Pran - and one daughter. Her granddaughter Senuri is also a child artist, who acted in the teledrama Appachchi. Senuri won many awards at local award festivals for her role in that drama.

She died on 31 May 2019 at the age of 82.

Theatre career
Wakishta joined Radio Ceylon in 1945 for Lama Pitiya program. She was involved in singing poems and raban poem in Lama pitiya at that time. While in Lama Pitiya, she started stage career with A. M. L. Zoysa's drama, Bahirawaya in 1953. Then she acted in many stage productions, such as Deepa, Piligath Warada, Pancha Kalyani and Sargent Weerasinha. In the stage drama Kalagola, she sang the song “Rasadara Siriya Paradana”, which is still a popular theatre song.

Television career
Wakishta is one of the earliest pillars in Sri Lankan television drama history. Her television career started with Sri Lanka's first teledrama Dimuthumuthu. She was a prominent figure in the South Asia's longest running single-episode television serial, Kopi Kade. Her role Somi Nona gained popularity among the public. She continued to perform in Kopi Kade for 26 years, finally she retired due to illness. She also acted in television serials including Vajira, Mal Kekulak Iki Binda and Himagiri Arana.

Selected serials
 Dimuthumuthu
 Himagiri Arana
Kawya 
 Kopi Kade
 Kula Kumariya 
 Mal Kekulak Iki Binda
 Me Suramya Paradisaya
 Mila
 Sihina Sithuvam 
 Sisila Ima
 Sudu Hansayo 
 Sulangata Medivee
 Suwanda Obai Amme
 Vajira

Death
According to her son Pran, she suffered from cancer since October 2014. She continued to take medication from Cancer Hospital, Maharagama. On 31 May 2019, Wakishta died while receiving treatments at National Hospital, Colombo. Her remains were laid at a Borella private parlour on 1 June 2019 and final rites were carried out on 2 June at the Borella General Cemetery.

Filmography
Wakishta started her film career with Sirisena Wimalaweera's 1955 film Podi Putha. Then she acted in more than 75 films. Some of her popular films include, Golu Hadawatha, Ahas Gawwa, Gehenu Lamai and Yuganthaya. In 1979, she won Best Supporting Actress award for the role in Gehenu Lamai at Presidential Film Festival and then in OCIC Signis Festival.
 
 No. denotes the Number of Sri Lankan film in the Sri Lankan cinema.

Awards

Presidential Film Festival

|-
|| 1979 ||| Gehenu Lamai || Best Supporting Actress ||

References

External links
Chitra Wakishta on Sinhala Cinema Database
Visiting celebrities add spice to Sri Lankan I-Day celebrations
Memories of Sri lanken Drama Actor Asela Jayakody's Funeral
Twenty teledramas:Tribute to writers

Sri Lankan film actresses
1936 births
2019 deaths